Palmetto is a city located mostly in Fulton County (originally Campbell County) and now partly in Coweta County in the U.S. state of Georgia. The population was 5,071 at the 2020 census.

History
The Georgia General Assembly incorporated Palmetto as a town in 1854. The community was named after the Palmetto Regiment of the Mexican–American War.

Demographics

2020 census

As of the 2020 United States census, there were 5,071 people, 1,950 households, and 1,200 families residing in the city.

2010 census
At the 2010 census, there were 4,488 people living in the city. The racial makeup of the city was 56.9% Black, 26.9% White, 0.1% Native American, 0.7% Asian, 0.0% Pacific Islander, 0.1% from some other race and 2.5% from two or more races. 12.7% were Hispanic or Latino of any race.

2000 census
At the 2000 census there were 3,400 people, 1,223 households, and 881 families living in the city. The racial makeup of the city was 47.41% White, 44.18% African American, 0.62% Native American, 0.03% Asian, 0.03% Pacific Islander, 5.38% from other races, and 2.35% from two or more races. Hispanic or Latino of any race were 11.62%.

Of the 1,223 households 38.7% had children under the age of 18 living with them, 42.4% were married couples living together, 23.5% had a female householder with no husband present, and 27.9% were non-families. 24.3% of households were one person and 10.1% were one person aged 65 or older.  The average household size was 2.78 and the average family size was 3.27.

The age distribution was 30.1% under the age of 18, 9.9% from 18 to 24, 31.5% from 25 to 44, 18.8% from 45 to 64, and 9.6% 65 or older.  The median age was 31 years. For every 100 females, there were 91.9 males.  For every 100 females age 18 and over, there were 88.9 males.

The median household income was $32,286 and the median family income  was $36,989. Males had a median income of $31,944 versus $20,417 for females. The per capita income for the city was $15,097.  About 7.8% of families and 11.3% of the population were below the poverty line, including 16.8% of those under age 18 and 6.8% of those age 65 or over.

Notable People 
Actor and country music star Jerry Reed lived here with foster parents in the 1950's. He attended Charles E Riley elementary school.

References

External links
 Palmetto at Georgia.gov
 Palmetto historical marker

Cities in the Atlanta metropolitan area
Cities in Georgia (U.S. state)
Cities in Fulton County, Georgia
Cities in Coweta County, Georgia
Populated places established in 1853